The Railway Exchange Building is an , 21-story high-rise office building in St. Louis, Missouri. The 1914 steel-frame building is in the Chicago school architectural style, and was designed by architect Mauran, Russell & Crowell. The building was the city's tallest when it opened, and remains the second-largest building in downtown St. Louis by interior area, with almost  of space.

The building was long home to the flagship store of the Famous-Barr chain of department stores — and the headquarters of its parent company May Department Stores — until Macy's purchased the brand; the store was rebranded as Macy's in 2006.  Macy's sold the building in 2008 and closed the store in 2013.

In January 2017, Hudson Holdings, a National Historic Property Developer based in Delray Beach, Florida, purchased the building for $20 million.

The city of St. Louis was granted an emergency condemnation on 4 Jan 2023, and proceeded to kick out people who appeared to be squatting and board up the building.

Notable people

 Marie Moentmann (1900-1974), worked at information desk.

References

Commercial buildings on the National Register of Historic Places in Missouri
Buildings designated early commercial in the National Register of Historic Places
National Register of Historic Places in St. Louis
Skyscraper office buildings in St. Louis
Commercial buildings completed in 1914
Terracotta
Downtown St. Louis
Chicago school architecture in Missouri
Buildings and structures in St. Louis
1930 establishments in Missouri
Tourist attractions in St. Louis